In mathematics, a definite quadratic form is a quadratic form over some real vector space  that has the same sign (always positive or always negative) for every non-zero vector of . According to that sign, the quadratic form is called positive-definite or negative-definite.

A semidefinite (or semi-definite) quadratic form is defined in much the same way, except that "always positive" and "always negative" are replaced by "never negative" and "never positive", respectively.

An indefinite quadratic form takes on both positive and negative values and is called an isotropic quadratic form.

More generally, these definitions apply to any vector space over an ordered field.

Associated symmetric bilinear form
Quadratic forms correspond one-to-one to symmetric bilinear forms over the same space. A symmetric bilinear form is also described as definite, semidefinite, etc. according to its associated quadratic form.  A quadratic form  and its associated symmetric bilinear form  are related by the following equations:

The latter formula arises from expanding

Examples
As an example, let , and consider the quadratic form

If  and  the quadratic form  is positive-definite, so Q evaluates to a positive number whenever  If one of the constants is positive and the other is 0, then  is positive semidefinite and always evaluates to either 0 or a positive number. If  and  the quadratic form is negative-definite and always evaluates to a negative number whenever  And if one of the constants is negative and the other is 0, then  is negative semidefinite and always evaluates to either 0 or a negative number.

In general a quadratic form in two variables will also involve a cross-product term in ·:

This bivariate quadratic form appears in the context of conic sections centered on the origin. If the general quadratic form above is equated to 0, the resulting equation is that of an ellipse if the quadratic form is positive or negative-definite, a hyperbola if it is indefinite, and a parabola if 

The square of the Euclidean norm in -dimensional space, the most commonly used measure of distance, is

In two dimensions this means that the distance between two points is the square root of the sum of the squared distances along the  axis and the  axis.

Matrix form

A quadratic form can be written in terms of matrices as

where  is any ×1 Cartesian vector  in which at least one element is not 0;  is an  symmetric matrix; and superscript  denotes a matrix transpose. If  is diagonal this is equivalent to a non-matrix form containing solely terms involving squared variables; but if  has any non-zero off-diagonal elements, the non-matrix form will also contain some terms involving products of two different variables.

Optimization

Definite quadratic forms lend themselves readily to optimization problems. Suppose the matrix quadratic form is augmented with linear terms, as

where  is an ×1 vector of constants. The first-order conditions for a maximum or minimum are found by setting the matrix derivative to the zero vector:

giving

assuming  is nonsingular. If the quadratic form, and hence , is positive-definite, the second-order conditions for a minimum are met at this point. If the quadratic form is negative-definite, the second-order conditions for a maximum are met.

An important example of such an optimization arises in multiple regression, in which a vector of estimated parameters is sought which minimizes the sum of squared deviations from a perfect fit within the dataset.

See also
Isotropic quadratic form
Positive-definite function
Positive-definite matrix
Polarization identity

Notes

References

.

Quadratic forms
Linear algebra